is a Japanese anime series adapted from the manga of the same name by Shigeru Mizuki, the manga which inspired the popular "Gegege no Kitarō" series in the late 60's. It was produced by Toei Animation and aired weekly between January 10, 2008 to March 20, 2008 on Fuji TV. According to Toei Animation, this adaptation is not considered part of "GeGeGe no Kitaro" franchise.

Episode list

References

HakabaKitarō2008